Burial Ground an area of land set aside for the burying of human bodies. A cemetery is a type of burial ground. Burial ground may refer to:
a burial ground or cemetery
 Burial Ground, novel by John Rickards (author)
 Burial Ground (film)
 Burial Ground (album) by Grave
 Burial Ground, album by Stick Figure